Konar Bani (also Romanized as Konār Banī) is a village in Ahram Rural District, in the Central District of Tangestan County, Bushehr Province, Iran. At the 2006 census, its population was 266, in 67 families.

References 

Populated places in Tangestan County